"Something for the Pain" is a song by American rock band Bon Jovi. It was released on September 5, 1995, as the second single from their sixth studio album, These Days (1995). It charted at number 15 in Canada, number eight on the UK Singles Chart, and number four in Finland. In the United States, the song was released as a double A-side with "Lie to Me" and peaked at number 76 on the Billboard Hot 100.

Music video
The music video for the song was released in 1995 and directed by Marty Callner. It shows a young man walking into a Virgin music store and heading to listen to some sample music. On the screen, it shows the band playing with other cast members singing the song in different scenarios. In the video are actors impersonating Eddie Vedder, Snoop Dogg, Dr. Dre, Courtney Love, and Scott Weiland, who also sing along to the song. The teenager enjoys the video when Bon Jovi appears, but expresses disdain when seeing the other artists. It ends with the teenager stealing a copy of the album These Days.

Track listings

US CD, 7-inch, and cassette single (with "Lie to Me")
 "Something for the Pain" (edit) – 3:57
 "Lie to Me" – 5:33

US maxi-CD single (with "Lie to Me")
 "Something for the Pain" – 4:46
 "Lie to Me" – 5:33
 "Wild in the Streets" (live) – 5:01
 "634-5789" – 3:08

UK CD1
 "Something for the Pain" – 4:46
 "This Ain't a Love Song" (live) – 6:27
 "I Don't Like Mondays" (featuring Bob Geldof—live) – 5:58

UK CD2
 "Something for the Pain" – 4:46
 "Livin' on a Prayer" (live) – 5:56
 "You Give Love a Bad Name" (live) – 3:40
 "Wild in the Streets" (live) – 5:01

UK cassette single and European CD single
 "Something for the Pain" (LP version) – 4:46
 "This Ain't a Love Song" (live) – 6:27

Australian CD single
 "Something for the Pain" (LP version) – 4:46
 "This Ain't a Love Song" (live) – 6:27
 "You Give Love a Bad Name" (live) – 3:40
 "Wild in the Streets" (live) – 5:01

Australian limited-edition CD single
 "Something for the Pain" (LP version) – 4:46
 "This Ain't a Love Song" (live) – 6:27
 "I Don't Like Mondays" (featuring Bob Geldof—live) – 5:58
 "Livin' on a Prayer" (live) – 5:56

Japanese CD single
 "Something for the Pain" (LP version) – 4:46
 "This Ain't a Love Song" (live) – 6:26
 "You Give Love a Bad Name" (live) – 3:51
 "Wild in the Streets" – 4:59
 "Como yo nadie te ha amado" (hidden track)

Japanese mini-CD single
 "Something for the Pain" (LP version)
 "Livin' on a Prayer" (live)
 "I Don't Like Mondays" (live)

Charts

Weekly charts

Year-end charts

Release history

References

Bon Jovi songs
1995 singles
1995 songs
Music videos directed by Marty Callner
Song recordings produced by Peter Collins (record producer)
Songs written by Desmond Child
Songs written by Jon Bon Jovi
Songs written by Richie Sambora